Maeve Anna Higgins (born 24 March 1981) is a comedian from Cobh, County Cork, Ireland and is based in New York. She was a principal actor and writer of the RTÉ television production Naked Camera, as well as for her own show Maeve Higgins' Fancy Vittles. Her book of essays We Have A Good Time, Don't We? was published by Hachette in 2012. She wrote for The Irish Times and produces radio documentaries. She previously appeared on The Ray D'Arcy Show on Today FM. She is a regular panelist on the NPR radio show Wait Wait... Don't Tell Me! Higgins appeared in her first starring film role in the 2019 Irish comedy Extra Ordinary.

Career

Higgins started in comedy in 2005 and has written and performed at many festivals and shows. She began her comedy career on the national radio station Today FM after auditioning for The Ray D'Arcy Show in February 2004. She failed to win.

From 2005 to 2007, she took part in the hidden camera show Naked Camera with fellow comedian and friend P. J. Gallagher. She landed her own television show, Maeve Higgins' Fancy Vittles, in 2009. Since 2010, she has occasionally been performing with Josie Long and Isy Suttie.

2006–2010 

2006
 ‘Ha Ha Yum’ with sister, Lilly, at the Edinburgh Festival Fringe
2007
 ‘Slightly Amazing’ at the Adelaide Fringe Festival
 ‘My News’ at the Edinburgh Festival Fringe
2008
 ‘Ha Ha Yum’ with Claudia O'Doherty at the Melbourne International Comedy Festival
 ‘Kitten Brides’ at the Edinburgh Festival Fringe
 ‘I Can’t Sleep’, a children’s play written by David O'Doherty. Higgins performed this skit with O'Doherty at the Edinburgh Festival Fringe.
2009
 ‘Kitten Brides’ at the Melbourne International Comedy Festival
 ‘I Can’t Sleep’ at the Melbourne International Comedy Festival
 ‘Kitten Brides’ at the New Zealand International Comedy Festival
2010
 'A Rare Sight' at the Brisbane Comedy Festival and Melbourne International Comedy Festival. Performed with Nick Coyle.
 'A Rare Sight' at the New Zealand International Comedy Festival. Nick Coyle could not attend due to surgery on shoulder.
 'Personal Best' at the Edinburgh Fringe Festival

Film

 2019: Extra Ordinary – Rose Dooley

Television

As herself
 2008: Spicks and Specks (TV series)
 2005, 2006: Tubridy Tonight
 2009: The Podge and Rodge Show
 2009: Talkin' 'Bout Your Generation
 2009: The Modest Adventures of David O'Doherty
 2009: Maeve Higgins' Fancy Vittles
 2015: StarTalk with Neil deGrasse Tyson

Acting work
 2005–2007: Naked Camera – Various characters
 2006: Magic – Chloe
 2012: Moone Boy
 2015: Inside Amy Schumer
 2016: Doc McStuffins - Gillian
2019: Extra Ordinary - Rose Dooley

As writer
 2005–2007: Naked Camera
 2009: Maeve Higgins' Fancy Vittles
2012: We Have A Good Time, Don't We?
2022: Tell Everyone on This Train I Love Them

Books

 2018: Maeve in America

Radio

 'What Would Maeve Do?' on The Ray D'Arcy Show
 2016: The Unbelievable Truth (Series 16, Episodes 3 & 6)
 2018–present: Wait Wait... Don't Tell Me
 2018: Everything Is Alive

Podcast 

 2018-present: Mothers of Invention

"Assistance dog" controversy
Higgins received widespread criticism from disability campaigners when she revealed on 30 March 2018 on the Irish Late Late Show that she purchased a service dog vest on Amazon and pretended that her pet dog was a service dog during a trans-Atlantic flight. She has apologized for her actions.

References

External links
 

Living people
1981 births
Irish expatriates in the United States
Irish television actresses
Irish television presenters
Irish women radio presenters
Irish women comedians
People from Cobh
Radio personalities from the Republic of Ireland
The Ray D'Arcy Show